John Fisher (born 16 September 1941) is a former  Australian rules footballer who played with Hawthorn in the Victorian Football League (VFL).

Notes

External links 

Living people
1941 births
Australian rules footballers from Victoria (Australia)
Hawthorn Football Club players
Kew Football Club players